Caulerpa ellistoniae is a species of seaweed in the family Caulerpaceae.

It is found along the coast in the South West region of Western Australia spreading north as far as Perth usually in deeper water.

References

ellistoniae
Endemic flora of Western Australia
Biota of the Indian Ocean
Plants described in 1955